Gopal Singha Dev was the fifty-fifth Raja of Mallabhum. He ruled from 1712 to 1748 CE. He helped the Nawab of Bengal, Alivardi Khan, in his war against the Marathas.

Mallabhum temples

Jor Mandir Group of Temples
In 1726, near Lalbandh, Gopal Singha Dev established a complex consisting of one small and two big temples known as the Jor Mandir Group of Temples. The temple situated in the north-western corner has an idol of Narayana. The temple standing in the center is extensively decorated.

References

Sources
 

Malla rulers
Kings of Mallabhum
18th-century Indian monarchs
Mallabhum